This is a list of the suburbs and localities of Rockhampton, Queensland, Australia.

Rockhampton